Malayamarutam is a rāgam in Carnatic music (musical scale of South Indian classical music). It is a janya rāgam (derived scale), as it does not have all the seven swaras (musical notes). This scale is used in Hindustani music in recent years by instrumentalists. This is a morning raga and regularly used in programmes and functions of the mornings.

Structure and Lakshana 

Malayamarutam is a symmetric rāgam that does not contain madhyamam. It is a hexatonic scale (shadava-shadava rāgam in Carnatic music classification). Its  structure (ascending and descending scale) is as follows (see swaras in Carnatic music for details on below notation and terms):

 : 
 : 

The notes used in this scale are shadjam, shuddha rishabham, antara gandharam, panchamam, chathusruthi dhaivatham and kaisiki nishadam. Malayamarutam is considered a janya rāgam of Chakravakam, the 16th Melakarta rāgam, though it can be derived from Ramapriya also, by dropping madhyamam.

Popular compositions 
Malayamarutam is a pleasing scale, but has only a few compositions in classical music. It has been used to score film music as well. Here are some popular kritis composed in Malayamarutam.
"Dhanyadevudo"by Patnam Subramania Iyer
Manasa Etulothune by Tyagaraja
Karpaga Manohara by Papanasam Sivan
Karunaanidiye Eesha and Smarane Onde by Purandara Dasa
Anumane Saamikindha by Arunachala Kavi
 Dayai puriya by Mayuram vedanayagampillai
Chandiran oli by Subramanya Bharati
Navaratna Vilasa by Kalyani Varadarajan
Film song:Usha Kiranangal(Guruvayoor Kesavan-G Devarajan Master)
Film song: Pularkala sundara (Oru Maymasa Pulariyil)

Film Songs

Language:Tamil

Related rāgams 
This section covers the theoretical and scientific aspect of this rāgam.

Scale similarities 
Valaji is a rāgam which does not have shuddha rishabham in both ascending and descending scales compared to Malayamarutam. Its  structure is S G3 P D2 N2 S : S N2 D2 P G3 S
Rasikaranjani is a ragam that does not have the nishadham in both arohana and avarohana compared to Malayamarutam.

Notes

References

Janya ragas